The 1978 Wales rugby union tour of Australia was a series of nine matches played by the Wales national rugby union team in Australia in May and June 1978. The Welsh team won five matches and lost four, including losing both of their international matches against the Australia national rugby union team.

Results
Scores and results list Wales's score first.

Test matches

First test

AUSTRALIA: Laurie Monaghan, Paddy Batch, Andrew Slack, Phil Crowe, Martin Knight, Paul McLean, Rod Hauser, Stan Pilecki, Peter Horton, Steve Finnane, Garrick Fay, David Hillhouse, Greg Cornelsen, Mark Loane, Tony Shaw (c)

WALES: J. P. R. Williams, Gerald Davies, Steve Fenwick, Ray Gravell, J. J. Williams, Gareth Davies, Brynmor Williams, Graham Price, Bobby Windsor, Charlie Faulkner, Geoff Wheel, Allan Martin, Jeff Squire, Derek Quinnell, Terry Cobner (c)

Second test

AUSTRALIA: Laurie Monaghan, Paddy Batch, Andrew Slack, Phil Crowe, Martin Knight, Paul McLean, Rod Hauser, Stan Pilecki, Peter Horton, Steve Finnane, Garrick Fay, David Hillhouse, Greg Cornelsen, Mark Loane, Tony Shaw (c)

WALES: Alun Donovan (rep Gareth Evans), Gerald Davies (c), Steve Fenwick, Ray Gravell, J. J. Williams, Gareth Davies, Terry Holmes, Graham Price (rep John Richardson), Bobby Windsor, Charlie Faulkner, Geoff Wheel, Allan Martin, J. P. R. Williams, Clive Davis, Stuart Lane

Touring party

Manager: Clive Rowlands
Assistant manager/coach: John Dawes
Captain: Terry Cobner

Full-back
J. P. R. Williams (Bridgend)

Three-quarters
Gerald Davies (Cardiff)
Gareth Evans (Newport)
J. J. Williams (Llanelli)
Pat Daniels (Cardiff)
Alun Donovan (Swansea)
Steve Fenwick (Bridgend)
Ray Gravell (Llanelli RFC)

Half-backs
Gareth Davies (Cardiff)
David Richards (Swansea)
Brynmor Williams (Newport)
Terry Holmes (Cardiff)

Forwards
Clive Davis (Newbridge)
Derek Quinnell (Llanelli)
Jeff Squire (Newport)
Terry Cobner (Pontypool)
Stuart Lane (Cardiff)
Barry Clegg (Swansea)
Allan Martin (Aberavon)
Geoff Wheel (Swansea)
Charlie Faulkner (Pontypool)
Graham Price (Pontypool)
John Richardson (Aberavon)
Mike Watkins (Cardiff)
Bobby Windsor (Pontypool)

References

1978
1978
1978 rugby union tours
1977–78 in Welsh rugby union
1978 in Australian rugby union
History of rugby union matches between Australia and Wales